Georgios Zacharopoulos (born 29 December 1897, date of death unknown) was a Greek athlete. He competed at the 1924 Summer Olympics and the 1928 Summer Olympics.

References

External links
 

1897 births
Year of death missing
Athletes (track and field) at the 1924 Summer Olympics
Athletes (track and field) at the 1928 Summer Olympics
Greek male discus throwers
Greek male javelin throwers
Olympic athletes of Greece
People from Phocis
Sportspeople from Central Greece